Bolivar is an unincorporated community in northern Denton County, Texas, United States, at the intersection of Farm Roads 2450 and 455, 14 miles northwest of Denton, on Clear Creek.

History
The community was founded as New Prospect in 1859. William Crawford sold the site to Hiram Daily, a Methodist minister and doctor, who opened a general store, and laid out and named the town. In 1861 Ben Brown, a farmer who had moved from Bolivar, Tennessee, suggested the renaming of the town and persuaded residents to vote for the name Bolivar by providing them free rum.

John Simpson Chisum ranched near Bolivar but moved his herds in 1863 to West Texas. Bolivar was three miles east of the Chisholm Trail, which ran through nearby cattle ranches. Cowboys on the trail came to Bolivar to stay at its hotel and patronize its saloons.

Development of the community was slow but steady until 1886. In that year, Bolivar merchants moved their businesses to Sanger, on the Gulf, Colorado and Santa Fe Railway—locals say Bolivar residents opposed giving up land for the railroad, whereas nearby Sanger, Texas to the east was much more accommodating.

From 1900 until 1940 Bolivar remained a small community of farmers. The economy received a slight boost from oil production during the 1940s and early 1950s. At one time 40 oilfields were in and around the community. In 1947 Bolivar had 115 residents. As the production of oil declined, however, so did the population. In 1980 a post office, a convenience store, and 40 residents remained.

In 1990 and in 2000 the population was still recorded as 40. Institutions include a gas station/cafe, a Southern Baptist Church, a non-denominational church, a sand company, and a veterinary clinic.

Education
The Sanger Independent School District, with all schools in Sanger, serves area students.

References

External links
Abelson, Frances Simpson and Rheba Rippey Marshall.  A History of Bolivar.

Unincorporated communities in Texas
Unincorporated communities in Denton County, Texas
Dallas–Fort Worth metroplex
Populated places established in 1859
1859 establishments in Texas